Yamil Antonio Benítez (born October 5, 1972) is a former right-handed outfielder, who last played for the Arizona Diamondbacks. He also played for the Montreal Expos and the Kansas City Royals in his career.

He was an outfielder who played in 169 games for 3 teams.  95 of those games with the Arizona Diamondbacks in their inaugural season.  His career batting average was .243 with 19 home runs and 60 RBIs.  He was chosen as the 19th player in the Arizona Diamondbacks Expansion Draft.

See also
 List of Major League Baseball players from Puerto Rico

External links

1972 births
Living people
Arizona Diamondbacks players
Burlington Bees players
Charlotte Knights players
Harrisburg Senators players
Jamestown Expos players
Kansas City Royals players
Louisville Bats players
Major League Baseball players from Puerto Rico
Major League Baseball outfielders
Montreal Expos players
Ottawa Lynx players
Puerto Rican expatriate baseball players in Canada
Sportspeople from San Juan, Puerto Rico